Leukocyte immunoglobulin-like receptor subfamily B member 5 is a protein that in humans is encoded by the LILRB5 gene.

This gene is a member of the leukocyte immunoglobulin-like receptor (LIR) family, which is found in a gene cluster at chromosomal region 19q13.4. The encoded protein belongs to the subfamily B class of LIR receptors which contain two or four extracellular immunoglobulin domains, a transmembrane domain, and two to four cytoplasmic immunoreceptor tyrosine-based inhibitory motifs (ITIMs). Several other LIR subfamily B receptors are expressed on immune cells where they bind to MHC class I molecules on antigen-presenting cells and inhibit stimulation of an immune response. Multiple transcript variants encoding different isoforms have been found for this gene.

References

Further reading

Immunoglobulin superfamily